Arthur Cohen may refer to:

 Arthur Cohen (politician) (1830–1914), English barrister and Liberal Party politician
 Arthur Juda Cohen (1910–2000), leading member of the Dutch Underground resistance movement
 Arthur A. Cohen (1928–1986), American Jewish scholar, theologian and author
 Arthur G. Cohen (1930–2014), American businessman and philanthropist